Neelofar is an upcoming Pakistani film starring Fawad Khan, Mahira Khan and Madiha Imam. The film is written and directed by Ammar Rasool and co-produced by Fawad Khan. This film will bring back the beloved on-screen couple of Fawad and Mahira for a third time after the hit drama Humsafar and the recently released The Legend of Maula Jatt.

The principal shooting for Neelofar was completed in December 2020. Mahira Khan plays the role of a blind girl. 

It was set to be released theatrically on 23 December 2022 but later got postponed.

Cast
Fawad Khan as Mansoor Ali Khan
Mahira Khan as Neelofar
Madiha Imam as Sara
Samiya Mumtaz as Eye Specialist
Faisal Qureshi as Asst. to Eye Specialist
Behroze Sabzwari as Fahkru
Rashid Farooqi as Tanveer
Atiqa Odho as Begum Kashif
Gohar Rasheed as Young Writer
Navid Shahzad as Dadi

References

External links
 

Upcoming films
Urdu-language Pakistani films
Pakistani romance films
Unreleased Pakistani films
Films about blind people